Zhanibek (Jänıbek) is a town in far north-western Kazakhstan on the border with Volgograd Oblast, Russia. It is the administrative center of Zhanybek District in West Kazakhstan Region. Population:   It is served by Dzhanybek railway station of the Volga Railway on the Krasny Kut — Astrakhan line between Kaisatskaya and Elton stations.

Geography 
The settlement is located 440 km (270 miles) west of the city of Oral in a semi-desert belt with mixed deserts.

References

Populated places in West Kazakhstan Region